The fifth competition weekend of the 2011–12 ISU Speed Skating World Cup was held in the Vikingskipet arena in Hamar, Norway, from Saturday, 11 February, until Sunday, 12 February 2012.

Schedule of events
The schedule of the event is below:

Medal summary

Men's events

Women's events

References

External links

5
Isu World Cup, 2011-12, 5
Sport in Hamar